Vero Electronics is the debut album by British band Add N to (X), released in 1996 on Blow Up Records. Add N to (X) were later signed by Daniel Miller to Mute Records.

Track listing

Personnel
All songs by Add N To (X)
Recorded at Neptune Studios, Sheffield
Produced by Parrot
Engineered by Dean
Drumming by Ed on track 2

References

Add N to (X) albums
1996 debut albums